George Fredrik Linde (born 4 December 1991) is a South African cricketer. He made his international debut for the South Africa cricket team in October 2019.

Domestic and T20 career
He was included in the Western Province cricket team squad for the 2015 Africa T20 Cup. In August 2017, he was named in Benoni Zalmi's squad for the first season of the T20 Global League. However, in October 2017, Cricket South Africa initially postponed the tournament until November 2018, with it being cancelled soon after.

In June 2018, he was named in the squad for the Cape Cobras team for the 2018–19 season. In September 2018, he was named in Western Province's squad for the 2018 Africa T20 Cup. In October 2018, he was named in Cape Town Blitz's squad for the first edition of the Mzansi Super League T20 tournament. In September 2019, he was named in the squad for the Cape Town Blitz team for the 2019 Mzansi Super League tournament.

In January 2020, in the 2019–20 CSA 4-Day Franchise Series, Linde took his tenth five-wicket haul in first-class cricket. In July 2020, Linde was named the four-day cricketer of the year at Cricket South Africa's annual awards ceremony. In April 2021, he was named in Western Province's squad, ahead of the 2021–22 cricket season in South Africa.

In April 2021, he was signed by Multan Sultans to play in the rescheduled matches in the 2021 Pakistan Super League. In January 2022, Linde signed a two-year deal to play for Kent County Cricket Club in England.

International career
On 5 September 2019, Linde was added to South Africa's Twenty20 International (T20I) squad for their series against India, but he did not play. The following month, he was added to South Africa's Test squad for the third match against India. He made his Test debut for South Africa, against India, on 19 October 2019. In March 2020, Linde was named in South Africa's One Day International (ODI) squad for their series against India. In November 2020, Linde was named in South Africa's squad for their limited overs series against England. He made his T20I debut for South Africa, against England, on 27 November 2020.

In February 2021, in South Africa's series against Pakistan, Linde took his first five-wicket haul in Test cricket. In August 2021, Linde was named in South Africa's ODI squad for their series against Sri Lanka. He made his ODI debut on 4 September 2021, for South Africa against Sri Lanka. Later the same month, Linde was named as one of three reserve players in South Africa's squad for the 2021 ICC Men's T20 World Cup.

References

External links
 

1991 births
Living people
Cricketers from Cape Town
South African cricketers
South Africa Test cricketers
South Africa One Day International cricketers
South Africa Twenty20 International cricketers
Cape Cobras cricketers
Cape Town Blitz cricketers
Kent cricketers
South Western Districts cricketers
Western Province cricketers